Matías Corral (born August 10, 1968) is a former Argentine rugby union player. He played as a prop.

He played in First Division for the San Isidro Club (SIC ) between 1988 and 1995. World champion with Los Pumitas under-19, in the World Cup 1987 and Puma from 1992 until his retirement after the 1995 Rugby World Cup, held in South Africa where he was honored as the best left prop of the world Cup that year, the only Argentine joined the Dream Team. Also, along with Patricio Noriega and Federico Mendez, they were named as the best first line of the world. He is the older brother of Alejo Corral, current player of SIC and Los Teros.

Sport career 
Matías always played at the San Isidro Club, debuted in first division in 1988, forming one of the most memorable first lines, with Juan José Angelillo and Diego Cash. He joined the under-19 and 21 province selection of Buenos Aires and Los Pumitas. In 1992 he joined the university selection in the World Cup played in Rome where he finished in the second place. Also in the same year, he represented the Senior Selection of Buenos Aires. In 1993, plays his first Test-Match with Los Pumas, in the victory against Japan. Of the 17 test matches played, he won 8 and lost 9.
Also, in 1993, with Buenos Aires Selection, he was part of the team who beat the Springboks 28-27, being one of the most valuable players of the match, which earned him a nomination for the Olimpia Award that year. In 1994 the prestigious Argentine journal Clarín, honored him as the best rugby player in Argentina. In 1995, he played his only World Cup, where Argentina showed a high level, despite all the previous problems, losing against England for 24-18, match in which the English could not score any tries. Then, came the losses against Samoa and Italy, where Corral score his only try in his short international career. Corral was recognized as the best left prop of the World Cup. Then, after the Rugby World Cup, and rejecting offers to play in several of the best clubs of Europe and Oceania, he decided to study a master in marketing in Boston University, USA.

Honours

Local Titles

Provincial Titles

International Titles

Cups Details

Present 
Corral, who always defined himself as "an athlete before a rugby player" makes his words do not die in the attempt. At the moment, when his has some free time as Country Manager of ZARA, he dedicate and prepares for marathons, but not just any marathon, he runs the Ironman, one of the hardest disciplines, consisting of three stages: 3,8 km swimming, 180 km in bicycle and 42 km running until the end line.
Matías has completed three Ironmans: Florida and the Rio de Janeiro in 2009 and China in 2010, where he recorded 1h.15m.52s., swimming, 5h.55m.11s, cycling and 4h.56m.01s., running, totaling a 12h.19m.28s time of pure activity without breaks or intervals.
His training allowed him to get back together with several of his old friends from the national team by being part of the Pumas Classics Team in the World Cup in Bermuda in 2010.

See also 
Pumas
San Isidro Club
Alejo Corral

References

External links 
 :es:Selección de rugby de Argentina#1995-1999
 http://www.mundialxv.com.ar/nota.php?id=330
 http://sanisidroclub.com.ar/index.php?option=com_content&view=article&id=2358:entrevista-a-matias-corral&catid=81:entrevistas&Itemid=200076
 https://web.archive.org/web/20120426002034/http://www.tackledeprimera.com/articulo.php?id_articulo=193

1968 births
Argentine rugby union players
Argentina international rugby union players
Rugby union players from Buenos Aires
Rugby union props
San Isidro Club rugby union players
Living people